Huang Shihui (1900–1945), born in Chiaochhengkha, Tainan Ken, Japanese Taiwan (modern-day Niaosong District, Kaohsiung, Taiwan), was a Taiwanese writer and a supporter of leftist movements. The debate on Taiwanese Hokkien literature which he started during the Japanese rule of Taiwan enlightened the development of Taiwanese rural literature.

References
article about Shihui and his contributions to literature

1900 births
1945 deaths
Taiwanese activists
Writers from Kaohsiung